Ebenezer is an unincorporated community in Jasper County, Texas. William P. M. and 
Mary Ann Dean founded the community by 1860 and established a Methodist church and cemetery by 1861. By the 1900s, Ebenezer also had a school. Both the school and the church closed by 1965; the church and cemetery were given historical markers in the 1980s.

References

Unincorporated communities in Jasper County, Texas
Unincorporated communities in Texas
1860 establishments in Texas